"Raise the Bar" is a song performed by Australian pop singer Bonnie Anderson and written by Anderson and songwriting duo DNA Songs. The song was released in November 8, 2013 as Anderson's debut solo single. It peaked at number 55 on the ARIA Charts in December 2013.

Upon release Anderson said "What I love about 'Raise the Bar' is that it's fun, a bit cheeky, doesn't take itself too seriously, yet still has that cool edge."

Music video
The music video for "Raise the Bar" was released on 19 November 2013 and uploaded onto YouTube three days later.

Track listing
Digital single
 "Raise the Bar" - 3:18

Digital single (Special Edition)
 "Raise the Bar" - 3:18
 "Empire State of Mind"  (acoustic)  - 4:15

Charts

Release history

References

2013 singles
2013 songs
Bonnie Anderson (singer) songs
Songs written by David Musumeci
Songs written by Anthony Egizii
Song recordings produced by DNA Songs
Sony Music Australia singles